Petrik Sander (born 17 November 1960 in Quedlinburg) is a German former footballer and currently the manager of FSV Budissa Bautzen.

Player career
He played over 150 games in the DDR-Oberliga for FC Energie Cottbus and Motor Nordhausen.

Coaching career
In 1997, he became assistant manager at FC Energie Cottbus. He was later made head coach, when Eduard Geyer left the club. In 2006, he led the club to promotion into the Bundesliga. His first season as a Bundesliga-coach ended with a 13th place, and the club was secured another year in the league. However, due to bad results in the beginning of the 2007–08 season, he was sacked on 23 September 2007. On 21 November 2008, he signed a contract as head coach at VfR Aalen and was fired on 5 May 2009. After seven months without a job, he signed as head coach of TuS Koblenz on 27 December 2009. He left Koblenz in 2011 after their relegation from the 3. Liga, becoming manager of FC Carl Zeiss Jena in November 2011. He was sacked by Jena shortly after the start of the 2013–14 season. On 1 January 2015 he returned to TuS Koblenz.

On 28 February 2019, he was appointed as manager of FSV Budissa Bautzen.

References

1960 births
Living people
People from Quedlinburg
East German footballers
German footballers
FC Energie Cottbus players
FC Energie Cottbus II players
German football managers
FC Energie Cottbus managers
FC Carl Zeiss Jena managers
Bundesliga managers
VfR Aalen managers
2. Bundesliga managers
DDR-Oberliga players
3. Liga managers
Association football forwards
TuS Koblenz managers
Footballers from Saxony-Anhalt